OCR may refer to:

Science and technology
 Optical character recognition, conversion of images of text into characters
 Organically moderated and cooled reactor, a type of nuclear reactor
 Oxidizable carbon ratio dating, a method of absolute dating
 Transvaginal oocyte retrieval, a technique used in vitro fertilization
 Oil control ring, a piston ring
 Over consolidation ratio, a consolidation measurement in geotechnical engineering

Offices of civil rights
 Office for Civil Rights, U.S. Department of Education
 State Office of Civil Rights, United States Department of State
 GSA Office of Civil Rights, General Services Administration
 HHS Office for Civil Rights, United States Department of Health and Human Services
 DOJ Office for Civil Rights, Office of Justice Programs

Economics
 Official cash rate, the interest rate paid by banks in the overnight money market
 Optimum currency region, a theoretical optimal area where one currency would make most benefit

Other uses
 Original cast recording, a recording of a stage musical featuring the show's original cast
 Otago Central Railway, now a heritage railway in Otago, New Zealand
 Ottawa Central Railway a Canadian Shortline owned by CN Rail
 OverClocked ReMix, an organization and website dedicated to preserving and paying tribute to video game music through re-orchestration and reinterpretation
 Oxford, Cambridge and RSA Examinations, an exam board in England, Wales and Northern Ireland
 Obstacle course racing

See also
 OCR-A, a font designed to simplify character recognition
 OCR-B